The 1899 Brown Bears football team represented Brown University as an independent during the 1899 college football season. Led by second-year head coach Edward N. Robinson, Brown compiled a record of 7–3–1. The team's captain was H. S. Pratt.

Schedule

References

Brown
Brown Bears football seasons
Brown Bears football